Sophie Alison Kiwala  (born 1962) is a former politician in Ontario, Canada. She was a Liberal member of the Legislative Assembly of Ontario from 2014 to 2018 who represented the riding of Kingston and the Islands.

Background
Kiwala was born and raised in Kingston, Ontario. She moved to Toronto shortly after finishing high school, and took courses at Humber College. In 1986 she married and moved with her husband to Turkey in the 1990s. She returned to Kingston in 1998 to look after her ailing mother. She studied political science at Queen's University. Later she worked as House of Commons Speaker Peter Milliken's office manager and then as Chief of Staff to MP Ted Hsu for seven years.

Politics
Kiwala ran for the Liberal nomination after incumbent Liberal MPP John Gerretsen announced in 2013 that he would not be running for re-election. She defeated three other candidates for the nomination, including former Kingston mayor Harvey Rosen. In the 2014 Ontario election, Kiwala was elected in the riding of Kingston and the Islands, defeating New Democrat candidate Mary Rita Holland by 6,022 votes.

During her tenure, she has served as a Parliamentary Assistant to several ministers, most recently as PA to the Minister of Indigenous Relations and Reconciliation.

In 2014, Kiwala focused attention on the issue of missing and murdered Aboriginal women in Canada. As part of her campaign to raise awareness, she publicized the Faceless Doll Project, an art project which uses faceless female dolls to represent the missing women. On October 23, 2014 she read a Members' motion in the legislature calling on the Ontario Legislature to support the National Aboriginal Organisations' call on the Federal government to initiate a public inquiry to study the issue.

In July 2020, Kiwala revealed that she was running for the Ontario Liberal Party again with the nomination set to take place in 2022. This led to a race between Kiwala and her former colleague Ted Hsu. Among priorities for the office, she listed the Long Term Care Act and encouraging "a much more compassionate view of individual residents".

Election results

References

External links

1962 births
21st-century Canadian politicians
21st-century Canadian women politicians
Humber College alumni
Living people
Ontario Liberal Party MPPs
People from Kingston, Ontario
Queen's University at Kingston alumni
Women MPPs in Ontario